Populism refers to a range of political stances that emphasize the idea of "the people" and often juxtapose this group against "the elite". It is frequently associated with anti-establishment and anti-political sentiment. The term developed in the late 19th century and has been applied to various politicians, parties and movements since that time, often as a pejorative. Within political science and other social sciences, several different definitions of populism have been employed, with some scholars proposing that the term be rejected altogether. 

A common framework for interpreting populism is known as the ideational approach: this defines populism as an ideology which presents "the people" as a morally good force and contrasts them against "the elite", who are portrayed as corrupt and self-serving. Populists differ in how "the people" are defined, but it can be based along class, ethnic, or national lines. Populists typically present "the elite" as comprising the political, economic, cultural, and media establishment, depicted as a homogeneous entity and accused of placing their own interests, and often the interests of other groups—such as large corporations, foreign countries, or immigrants—above the interests of "the people". Populist parties and social movements are often led by charismatic or dominant figures who present themselves as "the voice of the people". According to the ideational approach, populism is often combined with other ideologies, such as nationalism, liberalism, or socialism. Thus, populists can be found at different locations along the left–right political spectrum, and there exist both left-wing populism and right-wing populism.

Other scholars of the social sciences have defined the term populism differently. According to the popular agency definition used by some historians of United States history, populism refers to popular engagement of the population in political decision making. An approach associated with the political scientist Ernesto Laclau presents populism as an emancipatory social force through which marginalised groups challenge dominant power structures. Some economists have used the term in reference to governments which engage in substantial public spending financed by foreign loans, resulting in hyperinflation and emergency measures. In popular discourse—where the term has often been used pejoratively—it has sometimes been used synonymously with demagogy, to describe politicians who present overly simplistic answers to complex questions in a highly emotional manner, or with political opportunism, to characterise politicians who seek to please voters without rational consideration as to the best course of action.

In the 1960s, the term became increasingly popular among social scientists in Western countries, and later in the 20th century it was applied to various political parties active in liberal democracies. In the 21st century, the struggle over the term intensified in political discourse, particularly in the Americas and Europe, as it has been used to describe a range of left-wing, right-wing, and centrist groups that challenged the established parties.

Etymology and terminology

The word populism has been contested, mistranslated and used in reference to a diverse variety of movements and beliefs. The political scientist Will Brett characterised it as "a classic example of a stretched concept, pulled out of shape by overuse and misuse", while the political scientist Paul Taggart has said of populism that it is "one of the most widely used but poorly understood political concepts of our time".

The term originated as a form of self-designation, being used by members of the People's Party active in the United States during the late 19th century. In the Russian Empire during the same period, a completely different group referred to itself as the narodniki, which has often been mistranslated into English as populists, adding further confusion over the term. The Russian and American movements differed in various respects, and the fact that they shared a name was coincidental. In the 1920s, the term entered the French language, where it was used to describe a group of writers expressing sympathy for ordinary people.

Although the term began as a self-designation, part of the confusion surrounding it stems from the fact that it has rarely been used in this way, with few political figures openly describing themselves as "populists". As noted by the political scientist Margaret Canovan, "there has been no self-conscious international populist movement which might have attempted to control or limit the term's reference, and as a result those who have used it have been able to attach it a wide variety of meanings." In this it differs from other political terms, like "socialism" or "conservatism", which have been widely used as self-designations by individuals who have then presented their own, internal definitions of the word. Instead it shares similarities with terms such as "far left", "far right", or "extremist", which are often used in political discourse but rarely as self-designations.
 
In corporate-owned media, the term "populism" has often been conflated with other concepts like demagoguery, and generally presented as something to be "feared and discredited". It has often been applied to movements that are considered to be outside the political mainstream or a threat to democracy. The political scientists Yves Mény and Yves Surel noted that "populism" had become "a catchword, particularly in the media, to designate the newborn political or social movements which challenge the entrenched values, rules and institutions of democratic orthodoxy." Typically, the term is used against others, often in a pejorative sense to discredit opponents. Some of those who have repeatedly been referred to as "populists" in a pejorative sense have subsequently embraced the term while seeking to shed it of negative connotations. The French far-right politician Jean-Marie Le Pen for instance was often accused of populism and eventually responded by stating that "Populism precisely is taking into account the people's opinion. Have people the right, in a democracy, to hold an opinion? If that is the case, then yes, I am a populist."  Similarly, on being founded in 2003, the centre-left Lithuanian Labour Party declared: "we are and will be called populists."

Following 2016, the year which saw the election of Donald Trump as president of the United States and the United Kingdom's vote to leave the European Union—both events linked to populism—the word populism became one of the most widely used terms by international political commentators. In 2017, the Cambridge Dictionary declared it the Word of the Year.

Use in academia

Until the 1950s, use of the term populism remained restricted largely to historians studying the People's Party, but in 1954 the US sociologist Edward Shils published an article proposing populism as a term to describe anti-elite trends in US society more broadly. Following on from Shils' article, during the 1960s the term "populism" became increasingly popular among sociologists and other academics in the social sciences. In 1967 a Conference on Populism was held at the London School of Economics, the participants of which failed to agree on a clear, single definition. As a result of this scholarly interest, an academic field known as "populism studies" emerged. Interest in the subject grew rapidly: between 1950 and 1960 about 160 publications on populism appeared, while between 1990 and 2000 that number was over 1500. From 2000–2015, about 95 papers and books including the term "populism" were catalogued each year by Web of Science. In 2016, it grew to 266; in 2017, it was 488, and in 2018, it was 615. Taggart argued that this academic interest was not consistent but appeared in "bursts" of research that reflected the political conditions of the time.

Canovan noted that "if the notion of populism did not exist, no social scientist would deliberately invent it; the term is far too ambiguous for that". From examining how the term "populism" had been used, she proposed that seven different types of populism could be discerned. Three of these were forms of "agrarian populism"; these included farmers' radicalism, peasant movements, and intellectual agrarian socialism. The other four were forms of "political populism", representing populist dictatorship, populist democracy, reactionary populism, and politicians' populism. She noted that these were "analytical constructs" and that "real-life examples may well overlap several categories", adding that no single political movement fitted into all seven categories. In this way, Canovan conceived of populism as a family of related concepts rather than as a single concept in itself.

The confusion surrounding the term has led some scholars to suggest that it should be abandoned by scholarship. In contrast to this view, the political scientists Cas Mudde and Cristóbal Rovira Kaltwasser stated that "while the frustration is understandable, the term populism is too central to debates about politics from Europe to the Americas to simply do away with." Similarly, Canovan noted that the term "does have comparatively clear and definite meanings in a number of specialist areas" and that it "provides a pointer, however shaky, to an interesting and largely unexplored area of political and social experience". The political scientists Daniele Albertazzi and Duncan McDonnell thought that "if carefully defined, the term 'populism' can be used profitably to help us understand and explain a wide array of political actors". The political scientist Ben Stanley noted that "although the meaning of the term has proven controversial in the literature, the persistence with which it has recurred suggests the existence at least of an ineliminable core: that is, that it refers to a distinct pattern of ideas." Political scientist David Art argues that the concept of populism brings together disparate phenomena in an unhelpful manner, and ultimately obscures and legitimizes figures who are more comprehensively defined as nativists and authoritarians.

Although academic definitions of populism have differed, most of them have focused on the idea that it should reference some form of relationship between "the people" and "the elite", and that it entailed taking an anti-establishment stance. Beyond that, different scholars have emphasised different features that they wish to use to define populism. These differences have occurred both within specific scholarly disciplines and among different disciplines, varying for instance among scholars focusing on different regions and different historical periods.

Author Thomas Frank has criticized the common use of the term Populism to refer to far-right nativism and racism, noting that the original People's Party was relatively liberal on the rights of women and minorities by the standards of the time.

Ideational definition

A common approach to defining populism is known as the ideational approach. This emphasises the notion that populism should be defined according to specific ideas which underlie it, as opposed to certain economic policies or leadership styles which populist politicians may display. In this definition, the term populism is applied to political groups and individuals who make appeals to "the people" and then contrast this group against "the elite".

Adopting this approach, Albertazzi and McDonnell define populism as an ideology that "pits a virtuous and homogeneous people against a set of elites and dangerous 'others' who are together depicted as depriving (or attempting to deprive) the sovereign people of their rights, values, prosperity, identity, and voice". Similarly, the political scientist Carlos de la Torre defined populism as "a Manichean discourse that divides politics and society as the struggle between two irreconcilable and antagonistic camps: the people and the oligarchy or the power block."

In this understanding, note Mudde and Rovira Kaltwasser, "populism always involves a critique of the establishment and an adulation of the common people", and according to Ben Stanley, populism itself is a product of "an antagonistic relationship" between "the people" and "the elite", and is "latent wherever the possibility occurs for the emergence of such a dichotomy". The political scientist Manuel Anselmi proposed that populism be defined as featuring a "homogenous community-people" which "perceives itself as the absolute holder of popular sovereignty" and "expresses an anti-establishment attitude." This understanding conceives of populism as a discourse, ideology, or worldview. These definitions were initially employed largely in Western Europe, although later became increasingly popular in Eastern Europe and the Americas.

According to this approach, populism is viewed as a "thin ideology" or "thin-centred ideology" which on its own is seen as too insubstantial to provide a blueprint for societal change. It thus differs from the "thick-centred" or "full" ideologies such as fascism, liberalism, and socialism, which provide more far-reaching ideas about social transformation. As a thin-centred ideology, populism is therefore attached to a thick-ideology by populist politicians. Thus, populism can be found merged with forms of nationalism, liberalism, socialism, federalism, or conservatism. According to Stanley, "the thinness of populism ensures that in practice it is a complementary ideology: it does not so much overlap with as diffuse itself throughout full ideologies."

Populism is, according to Mudde and Rovira Kaltwasser, "a kind of mental map through which individuals analyse and comprehend political reality".
Mudde noted that populism is "moralistic rather than programmatic". It encourages a binary world-view in which everyone is divided into "friends and foes", with the latter being regarded not just as people who have "different priorities and values" but as being fundamentally "evil". In emphasising one's purity against the corruption and immorality of "the elite", from which "the people" must remain pure and untouched, populism prevents compromise between different groups.

Right and left-wing

As a result of the various different ideologies with which populism can be paired, the forms that populism can take vary widely. Populism itself cannot be positioned on the left–right political spectrum, and both right and left-wing populisms exist. Populist movements can also mix divisions between left and right, for instance by combining xenophobic attitudes commonly associated with the far-right with redistributive economic policies closer to those of the left.

The ideologies with which populism can be paired can be contradictory, resulting in different forms of populism that can oppose each other. For instance, in Latin America during the 1990s, populism was often associated with politicians like Peru's Alberto Fujimori who promoted neoliberal economics, while in the 2000s it was instead associated with those like Venezuela's Hugo Chávez who promoted socialist programs. As well as populists of the left and right, populist figures like Italy's Beppe Grillo have been characterised as centrist and liberals, while groups like Turkey's Justice and Development Party have been described as combining populism with Islamism, and India's Bharatiya Janata Party has been seen as mixing populism with Hindu nationalism. Although populists of different ideological traditions can oppose each other, they can also form coalitions, as was seen in the Greek coalition government which brought together the left-wing populist Syriza and the right-wing populist Independent Greeks in 2015.

Adherents of the ideational definition have also drawn a distinction between left and right-wing populists. The latter are presented as juxtaposing "the people" against both "the elite" and an additional group who are also regarded as being separate from "the people" and whom "the elite" is seen to favour, such as immigrants, homosexuals, travellers, or communists.
Populist leaders thus "come in many different shades and sizes" but, according to Mudde and Rovira Kaltwasser, share one common element: "a carefully crafted image of the vox populi". Stanley expressed the view that although there are "certain family resemblances" that can be seen between populist groups and individuals, there was "no coherent tradition" unifying all of them.
While many left-wing parties in the early 20th century presented themselves as the vanguard of the proletariat, by the early 21st century left-wing populists were presenting themselves as the "voice of the people" more widely. On the political right, populism is often combined with nationalism, with "the people" and "the nation" becoming fairly interchangeable categories in their discourse.
Some political scientists have also argued that populism can be divided into "inclusionary" and "exclusionary" forms.

"The people"

For populists, "the people" are presented as being homogeneous, and also virtuous. In simplifying the complexities of reality, the concept of "the people" is vague and flexible, with this plasticity benefitting populists who are thus able to "expand or contract" the concept "to suit the chosen criteria of inclusion or exclusion" at any given time. In employing the concept of "the people", populists can encourage a sense of shared identity among different groups within a society and facilitate their mobilisation toward a common cause. One of the ways that populists employ the understanding of "the people" is in the idea that "the people are sovereign", that in a democratic state governmental decisions should rest with the population and that if they are ignored then they might mobilise or revolt. This is the sense of "the people" employed in the late 19th century United States by the People's Party and which has also been used by later populist movements in that country.

A second way in which "the people" is conceived by populists combines a socioeconomic or class based category with one that refers to certain cultural traditions and popular values. The concept seeks to vindicate the dignity of a social group who regard themselves as being oppressed by a dominant "elite" who are accused of treating "the people's" values, judgements, and tastes with suspicion or contempt. A third use of "the people" by populists employs it as a synonym for "the nation", whether that national community be conceived in either ethnic or civic terms. In such a framework, all individuals regarded as being "native" to a particular state, either by birth or by ethnicity, could be considered part of "the people".

Populism typically entails "celebrating them  the people", in Stanley's words.
The political scientist Paul Taggart proposed the term "the heartland" to better reflect what populists often mean in their rhetoric. According to Taggart, "the heartland" was the place "in which, in the populist imagination, a virtuous and unified population resides". Who this "heartland" is can vary between populists, even within the same country. For instance, in Britain, the centre-right Conservative Party conceived of "Middle England" as its heartland, while the far-right British National Party conceived of the "native British people" as its heartland.
Mudde noted that for populists, "the people" "are neither real nor all-inclusive, but are in fact a mythical and constructed sub-set of the whole population". They are an imagined community, much like the imagined communities embraced and promoted by nationalists.

Populism often entails presenting "the people" as the underdog. Populists typically seek to reveal to "the people" how they are oppressed. In doing so, they do not seek to change "the people", but rather seek to preserve the latter's "way of life" as it presently exists, regarding it as a source of good. For populists, the way of life of "the people" is presented as being rooted in history and tradition and regarded as being conducive to public good.  Although populist leaders often present themselves as representatives of "the people", they often come from elite strata in society; examples like Berlusconi, Fortuyn, and Haider were all well-connected to their country's political and economic elites.

Populism can also be subdivided into "inclusionary" and "exclusionary" forms, which differ in their conceptions of who "the people" are. Inclusionary populism tends to define "the people" more broadly, accepting and advocating for minority and marginalised groups, while exclusionary populism defines "the people" in a much stricter sense, generally being focused on a particular sociocultural group and antagonistic against minority groups. However, this is not exactly a pure dichotomy—exclusive populists can still give voice to those who feel marginalised by the political status quo and include minorities if it is advantageous, while inclusive populists can vary significantly in how inclusive they actually are. In addition, all populisms are implicitly exclusionary, since they define "the people" against "the elite", thus some scholars argue that the difference between populisms is not whether a particular populism excludes but whom it excludes from its conception of "the people".

"The elite"

Anti-elitism is widely considered the central characteristic feature of populism, although Mudde and Rovira Kaltwasser argued that anti-elitism alone was not evidence of populism. Rather, according to Stanley, in populist discourse the "fundamental distinguishing feature" of "the elite" is that it is in an "adversarial relationship" with "the people". In defining "the elite", populists often condemn not only the political establishment, but also the economic elite, cultural elite, academic elite, and the media elite, which they present as one homogeneous, corrupt group. In early 21st century India, the populist Bharatiya Janata Party for instance accused the dominant Indian National Congress party, the Communist Party of India, NGOs, academia, and the English-language media of all being part of "the elite".

When operating in liberal democracies, populists often condemn dominant political parties as part of "the elite" but at the same time do not reject the party political system altogether, instead either calling for or claiming to be a new kind of party different from the others. Although condemning almost all those in positions of power within a given society, populists often exclude both themselves and those sympathetic to their cause even when they too are in positions of power. For instance, the Freedom Party of Austria (FPÖ), a right-wing populist group, regularly condemned "the media" in Austria for defending "the elite", but excluded from that the Kronen Zeitung, a widely read tabloid that supported the FPÖ and its leader Jörg Haider.

When populists take governmental power, they are faced with a challenge in that they now represent a new elite. In such cases—like Chávez in Venezuela and Vladimír Mečiar in Slovakia—populists retain their anti-establishment rhetoric by making changes to their concept of "the elite" to suit their new circumstances, alleging that real power is not held by the government but other powerful forces who continue to undermine the populist government and the will of "the people" itself. In these instances, populist governments often conceptualise "the elite" as those holding economic power. In Venezuela, for example, Chávez blamed the economic elite for frustrating his reforms, while in Greece, the left-wing populist Prime Minister Alexis Tsipras accused "the lobbyists and oligarchs of Greece" of undermining his administration. In populist instances like these, the claims made have some basis in reality, as business interests seek to undermine leftist-oriented economic reform.

Although left-wing populists who combine populist ideas with forms of socialism most commonly present "the elite" in economic terms, the same strategy is also employed by some right-wing populists. In the United States during the late 2000s, the Tea Party movement—which presented itself as a defender of the capitalist free market—argued that big business, and its allies in Congress, seeks to undermine the free market and kill competition by stifling small business. Among some 21st century right-wing populists, "the elite" are presented as being left-wing radicals committed to political correctness. The Dutch right-wing populist leader Pim Fortuyn referred to this as the "Church of the Left".

In some instances, particularly in Latin America and Africa, "the elites" are conceived not just in economic but also in ethnic terms, representing what political scientists have termed ethnopopulism. In Bolivia, for example, the left-wing populist leader Evo Morales juxtaposed the mestizo and indigenous "people" against an overwhelmingly European "elite", declaring that "We Indians [i.e. indigenous people] are Latin America's moral reserve". In the Bolivian case, this was not accompanied by a racially exclusionary approach, but with an attempt to build a pan-ethnic coalition which included European Bolivians against the largely European Bolivian elite. In South Africa, the populist Julius Malema has presented black South Africans as the "people" whom he claims to represent, calling for the expropriation of land owned by the white minority without compensation. In areas like Europe where nation-states are more ethnically homogenous, this ethnopopulist approach is rare given that the "people" and "elite" are typically of the same ethnicity.

For some populist leaders and movements, the term "the elite" also refers to an academic or intellectual establishment and, as such, entails scholars, intellectuals, experts, or organized science as a whole. Such leaders and movements may criticise scientific knowledge as abstract, useless, and ideologically biased, and instead demand common sense, experiential knowledge, and practical solutions to be "true knowledge". Examples of such a "science-related populism" are British Conservative Party politician Michael Gove suggesting that the British people "have had enough of experts" or US entrepreneur Peter Thiel praising common sense as an "incredible indictment of our elites".

In various instances, populists claim that "the elite" is working against the interests of the country. In the European Union (EU), for instance, various populist groups allege that their national political elites put the interests of the EU itself over those of their own nation-states. Similarly, in Latin America populists often charge political elites with championing the interests of the United States over those of their own countries.

Another common tactic among populists, particularly in Europe, is the accusation that "the elites" place the interests of immigrants above those of the native population. The Zambian populist Michael Sata for instance adopted a xenophobic stance during his campaigns by focusing his criticism on the country's Asian minority, decrying Chinese and Indian ownership of businesses and mines. In India, the right-wing populist leader Narendra Modi rallied supporters against Muslim Bangladeshi migrants, promising to deport them. In instances where populists are also antisemitic (such as Jobbik in Hungary and Attack in Bulgaria) the elites are accused of favouring Israeli and wider Jewish interests above those of the national group.  Antisemitic populists often accuse "the elite" of being made up of many Jews as well. When populists emphasise ethnicity as part of their discourse, "the elite" can sometimes be presented as "ethnic traitors".

General will

A third component of the ideational approach to populism is the idea of the general will, or volonté générale. An example of this populist understanding of the general will can be seen in Chávez's 2007 inaugural address, when he stated that "All individuals are subject to error and seduction, but not the people, which possesses to an eminent degree of consciousness of its own good and the measure of its independence. Because of that its judgement is pure, its will is strong, and none can corrupt or even threaten it." For populists, the general will of "the people" is something that should take precedence over the preferences of "the elite".

As noted by Stanley, the populist idea of the general will is connected to ideas of majoritarianism and authenticity. In doing so they often emphasise their physical proximity to "the people" and their distance from "the elites".
Sheri Berman notes that while populists often engage in democratic rhetoric, they frequently ignore or devalue norms of liberal democracy such as freedom of speech, freedom of the press, legitimate opposition, separation of powers and constraints on presidential power.

In emphasising the general will, many populists share the critique of representative democratic government previously espoused by the French philosopher Jean-Jacques Rousseau. This approach regards representative governance as an aristocratic and elitist system in which a country's citizens are regarded as passive entities. Rather than choosing laws for themselves, these citizens are only mobilised for elections in which their only option is to select their representatives rather than taking a more direct role in legislation and governance. Populists often favour the use of direct democratic measures such as referendums and plebiscites. For this reason, Mudde and Rovira Kaltwasser suggested that "it can be argued that an elective affinity exists between populism and direct democracy", although Stanley cautioned that "support for direct democracy is not an essential attribute of populism."  Populist notions of the "general will" and its links with populist leaders are usually based on the idea of "common sense".

Versus elitism and pluralism

Stanley noted that rather than being restricted purely to populists, appeals to "the people" had become "an unavoidable aspect of modern political practice", with elections and referendums predicated on the notion that "the people" decide the outcome. Thus, a critique of the ideational definition of populism is that it becomes too broad and can potentially apply to all political actors and movements. Responding to this critique, Mudde and Rovira Kaltwasser argued that the ideational definition did allow for a "non-populism" in the form of both elitism and pluralism.

Elitists share the populist binary division but reverse the associations. Whereas populists regard the elites as bad and the common people as good, elitists view "the people" as being vulgar, immoral, and dangerous and "the elites" as being morally, culturally, and intellectually superior. Elitists want politics to be largely or entirely an elite affair; some—such as Spain's Francisco Franco and Chile's Augusto Pinochet—reject democracy altogether, while others—like Spain's José Ortega y Gasset and Austria's Joseph Schumpeter—support a limited model of democracy.

Pluralism differs from both elitism and populism by rejecting any dualist framework, instead viewing society as a broad array of overlapping social groups, each with their own ideas and interests. Pluralists argue that political power should not be held by any single group—whether defined by their gender, ethnicity, economic status, or political party membership—and should instead be distributed. Pluralists encourage governance through compromise and consensus in order to reflect the interests of as many of these groups as possible. Unlike populists, pluralists do not believe that such a thing as a "general will" exists. Some politicians do not seek to demonise a social elite; for many conservatives for example, the social elite are regarded as the bulwark of the traditional social order, while for some liberals, the social elite are perceived as an enlightened legislative and administrative cadre.

Other definitions

The popular agency definition to populism uses the term in reference to a democratic way of life that is built on the popular engagement of the population in political activity. In this understanding, populism is usually perceived as a positive factor in the mobilisation of the populace to develop a communitarian form of democracy. This approach to the term is common among historians in the United States and those who have studied the late 19th century People's Party.

The Laclauan definition of populism, so called after the Argentinian political theorist Ernesto Laclau who developed it, uses the term in reference to what proponents regard as an emancipatory force that is the essence of politics. In this concept of populism, it is believed to mobilise excluded sectors of society against dominant elites and changing the status quo. Laclau's initial emphasis was on class antagonisms arising between different classes, although he later altered his perspective to claim that populist discourses could arise from any part of the socio-institutional structure. For Laclau, socialism was "the highest form of populism". His understandings of the topic derived in large part from his focus on politics in Latin America. This definition is popular among critics of liberal democracy and is widely used in critical studies and in studies of West European and Latin American politics. Harry C. Boyte for example defined populism as "a politics of civic agency" which "develops the power of 'the people' to shape their destiny", as examples citing both the Russian narodniks and the South African Black Consciousness Movement.

The socioeconomic definition of populism applies the term to what it regards as an irresponsible form of economic policy by which a government engages in a period of massive public spending financed by foreign loans, after which the country falls into hyperinflation and harsh economic adjustments are then imposed. This use of the term was used by economists like Rudiger Dornbusch and Jeffrey Sachs and was particularly popular among scholars of Latin America during the 1980s and 1990s. Since that time, this definition continued to be used by some economists and journalists, particularly in the US, but was uncommon among other social sciences. This definition relies on focusing on socialist and other left-wing forms of populism; it does not apply to other groups commonly understood as populist which adopted right-wing stances on economic issues.

An additional framework has been described as the "political-strategic" approach. This applies the term populism to a political strategy in which a charismatic leader seeks to govern based on direct and unmediated connection with their followers. Kurt Weyland defined this conception of populism as "a political strategy through which a personalist leader seeks or exercises government power based on direct, unmediated, uninstitutionalized support from large numbers of mostly unorganized followers". This is a definition of the term that is popular among scholars of non-Western societies. By focusing on leadership, this concept of populism does not allow for the existence of populist parties or populist social movements; under this definition, for instance, the US People's Party which first invented the term populism could not be considered populist. Mudde suggested that although the idea of a leader having direct access to "the people" was a common element among populists, it is best regarded as a feature which facilitates rather than defines populism.

In popular discourse, populism is sometimes used in a negative sense in reference to politics which involves promoting extremely simple solutions to complex problems in a highly emotional manner. Mudde suggested that this definition "seems to have instinctive value" but was difficult to employ empirically because almost all political groups engage in sloganeering and because it can be difficult to differentiate an argument made emotionally from one made rationally. Mudde thought that this phenomenon was better termed demagogy rather than populism. Another use of the term in popular discourse is to describe opportunistic policies designed to quickly please voters rather than deciding a more rational course of action. Examples of this would include a governing political party lowering taxes before an election or promising to provide things to the electorate which the state cannot afford to pay for. Mudde suggested that this phenomenon is better described as opportunism rather than populism.

Demand-side factors 
One area of debate in explaining populism is whether its main cause is based in the needs of citizens (demand-side explanations)  or in the failures of governments (supply-side explanations).  In focusing on the changing grievances or demands of citizens, demand-side explanations can be seen as bottom-up explanations, while supply-side explanations, in focusing on political actors and institutions, can be seen as top-down explanations.  Various demand-side factors have been claimed to make it more likely that individuals will support populist ideas. Economists and political economists often emphasize the importance of economic concerns while political scientists and sociologists often emphasize sociocultural concerns in their analysis of demand-side factors.

Economic grievance 
The economic grievance thesis argues that economic factors, such as deindustrialisation, economic liberalisation, and deregulation, are causing the formation of a 'left-behind' precariat with low job security, high inequality, and wage stagnation, who then support populism. Some theories only focus on the effect of economic crises, or inequality. Another objection for economic reasons is due to the globalization that is taking place in the world today. In addition to criticism of the widening inequality caused by the elite, the widening inequality among the general public caused by the influx of immigrants and other factors due to globalization is also a target of populist criticism.

The evidence of increasing economic disparity and volatility of family incomes is clear, particularly in the United States, as shown by the work of Thomas Piketty and others.  Commentators such as Martin Wolf emphasize the importance of economics.  They warn that such trends increase  resentment and make people susceptible to populist rhetoric. Evidence for this is mixed.  At the macro level, political scientists report that xenophobia, anti-immigrant feeling, and resentment towards out-groups tend to be higher during difficult economic times. Economic crises have been associated with gains by far-right political parties. However, there is little evidence at the micro- or individual level to link individual economic grievances and populist support.

Modernisation 
The modernisation losers theory argues that certain aspects of transition to modernity have caused demand for populism. Some arguments rely on the belief that anomie has followed industrialisation and resulted in "dissolution, fragmentation and differentiation", weakening the traditional ties of civil society, and increasing individualization.  Populism offers a broad identity which gives sovereignty to the previously marginalized masses as "the people". However, empirical studies suggest that supporters of radical right-wing populism occur across the social spectrum, and are not more likely to appear in groups defined as "modernisation losers".

Cultural backlash 
Other theories argue that grievances have a primarily sociocultural rather than an economic basis.  For example, the cultural backlash thesis argues that right-wing populism is reaction to the rise of postmaterialism in many developed countries, including the spread of feminism, multiculturalism, and environmentalism. According to this view, the spread of ideas and values through a society challenges accepted norms until society reaches a 'tipping point', which causes a reaction, in this case support for right-wing populism. Some theories limit this argument to being a reaction to just the increase of ethnic diversity from immigration. Such theories are particularly popular with sociologists and with political scientists studying industrial world and American politics. 

The empiric studies testing this theory have produced highly contradicting results. 
At the micro- or individual level, there are strong connections between individual positions on sociocultural issues (such as immigration policy and "racial animus") and right-wing populist voting. However, at the macro level, studies have not shown clear relationships between measures of populist sentiment in countries and actual right-wing party support. 

However, there is strong evidence from  political scientists and political psychologists documenting the influence of group-based identity threats on voters. Those who identify as part of a group and perceive it as being under threat are likely to support political actors who promise to protect the status and identity of their group. While such research often focuses on white identity, results apply broadly to other social groups that perceive themselves to be under threat.

Recent democratization 
The length of time since a country has been democratized has also been linked to its potential for populist success. This is claimed to be because younger democracies have less established political parties and weaker liberal democratic norms. For example, populist success in Eastern Europe has been linked to the legacy of communism. However, this explanation suffers from the lack of success of populism in most post-communist countries.

Supply-side factors 
Supply-side explanations focus on political actors and institutions and the ways in which governments may fail to respond to the changing conditions that affect citizens.  Economic, social, and other structural trends are seen as being modified by institutions as they determine political outcomes. In this view, citizens turn to populism when governments do not respond effectively to the challenges they and their citizens face. Research supports the idea that populism is more likely to thrive when mainstream parties on the center-left and center-right do not address important contemporary issues and do not offer clear alternatives to voters. Coalitions that blur distinctions on positions are also likely to increase populism.

In Political Order in Changing Societies (1968), Samuel P. Huntington argues that rapid change (social or economic) in a society will increase the demands of its citizens.  Unless political institutions are responsive and effective, they are unlikely to respond to and satisfy such demands. If political systems are weak or have become unresponsive over time, then dissatisfaction, political disorder and even violence become more likely.  Political institutions that do not respond to social and economic changes are likely to fail.  Responsive political systems can adapt to more severe challenges than unresponsive ones.  Huntington's ideas grew out of work on Third World countries, but are also applicable to  advanced industrial countries.

In a supply-side view of American politics, populism can be seen as a symptom of institutional decay.  It can be suggested that political factors such as gerrymandering, the Electoral College, special-interest lobbying and dark money, are distorting political and economic debate, and decreasing the ability of the government to respond to the concerns of large numbers of citizens. This in turn generates dissatisfaction, which may increase the likelihood that citizens will support populism. Scholars studying the European Union have suggested that European integration may have had the undesired effect of decreasing the system's responsiveness to  voters, as law and policy-making increasingly became the responsibility of the European Union. This too may have increased support for populism.  Institutions such as the European Central Bank may also distance decision-making from electoral power. It has been argued that political parties themselves have become disconnected from society, and unable to respond to citizen's concerns.

Voluntarism  
Another underlying debate in discussions of populism is the comparison of structural and voluntarist approaches. Voluntarist or agency-based explanations focus on the behaviors of politicians and parties, including populists themselves.

An important area of research is the examination of how parties develop, and how responses to new parties shape them.  Successful politicians and parties shape the formation of agendas, identifying and increasing the salience of issues which they believe will benefit them.

Established parties may adopt various strategies when a new party appears: dismissive, adversarial, or accommodative. 
A dismissive strategy such as ignoring a party and its issue(s) can only be effective if the issue involved is unimportant or short-lived. Otherwise, dismissing an issue leaves ownership of the issue with the new party and allows them to attract any voters who see the issue as important.
In an adversarial response, a mainstream party directly engages over an issue, emphasizing their opposition to the new party's position.  This increases the issue's visibility, makes it a focus of ongoing political debate, and can reinforce the new party's ownership of it. An adversarial response can be to the benefit of a mainstream party if most voters (or at least the mainstream party's voters) disagree with the new party's position and are unlikely to ally with it as a result.
Finally, an accommodative strategy is to move the mainstream party closer to the position advocated by the new party, in hopes of retaining voters who care about the issue. This works best if adopted early, before a new party is heavily identified with an issue. If an issue is important, long-lived and of strong interest to its supporters, a mainstream party can benefit from quickly shifting its position to one closer to the new party.

Similarly, a populist party with neo-fascist or antidemocratic roots may be able to increase its support by moderating its views to a milder form of its original position (e.g. from neofascist to xenophobic.) Right-wing populists are more effective in mobilizing voters around issues when mainstream parties ignore the issue or offer alternatives that are not aligned with voter opinions.  They are also more likely to benefit from emphasizing social and cultural issues such as immigration and race, appealing to voters who are positioned economically towards the left-wing but hold socially conservative views.

Mobilisation

There are three forms of political mobilisation which populists have adopted: that of the populist leader, the populist political party, and the populist social movement. The reasons why voters are attracted to populists differ, but common catalysts for the rise of populists include dramatic economic decline or a systematic corruption scandal that damages established political parties. For instance, the Great Recession of 2007 and its impact on the economies of southern Europe was a catalyst for the rise of Syriza in Greece and Podemos in Spain, while the Mani pulite corruption scandal of the early 1990s played a significant part in the rise of the Italian populist Silvio Berlusconi. Another catalyst for the growth of populism is a widespread perception among voters that the political system is unresponsive to them. This can arise when elected governments introduce policies that are unpopular with their voters but which are implemented because they are considered to be "responsible" or imposed by supranational organisations; in Latin America, for example, many countries passed unpopular economic reforms under pressure from the International Monetary Fund and World Bank while in Europe, many countries in the European Union were pushed to implement unpopular economic austerity measures by the union's authorities. Decentralisation of political power is a very useful tool for populists to use to their benefit, this is because it allows them to speak more directly to the people of whom they seek to gain attention and votes.

Leaders

Populism is often associated with charismatic and dominant leaders, and the populist leader is, according to Mudde and Rovira Kaltwasser, "the quintessential form of populist mobilization". These individuals campaign and attract support on the basis of their own personal appeal. Their supporters then develop a perceived personal connection with the leader. For these leaders, populist rhetoric allows them to claim that they have a direct relationship with "the people", and in many cases they claim to be a personification of "the people" themselves, presenting themselves as the vox populi or "voice of the people". Hugo Chavez for instance stated: "I demand absolute loyalty to me. I am not an individual, I am the people." Populist leaders can also present themselves as the saviour of the people because of their perceived unique talents and vision, and in doing so can claim to be making personal sacrifices for the good of the people. Because loyalty to the populist leader is thus seen as representing loyalty to the people, those who oppose the leader can be branded "enemies of the people".

The overwhelming majority of populist leaders have been men, although there have been various females occupying this role. Most of these female populist leaders gained positions of seniority through their connections to previously dominant men; Eva Perón was the wife of Juan Perón, Marine Le Pen the daughter of Jean-Marie Le Pen, Keiko Fujimori the daughter of Alberto Fujimori, and Yingluck Shinawatra the sister of Thaksin Shinawatra.

Rhetorical styles

Canovan noted that populists often used "colourful and undiplomatic language" to distinguish themselves from the governing elite. In Africa, several populist leaders have distinguished themselves by speaking in indigenous languages rather than either French or English. Populist leaders often present themselves as people of action rather than people of words, talking of the need for "bold action" and "common sense solutions" to issues which they call "crises". Male populist leaders often express themselves using simple and sometimes vulgar language in an attempt to present themselves as "the common man" or "one of the boys" to add to their populist appeal.

An example of this is Umberto Bossi, the leader of the right-wing populist Italian Lega Nord, who at rallies would state "the League has a hard-on" while putting his middle-finger up as a sign of disrespect to the government in Rome. Another recurring feature of male populist leaders is the emphasis that they place on their own virility. An example of this is the Italian Prime Minister Silvio Berlusconi, who bragged about his bunga bunga sex parties and his ability to seduce young women. Among female populist leaders, it is more common for them to emphasise their role as a wife and mother. The US right-wing populist Sarah Palin for instance referred to herself as a "hockey mom" and a "mama grizzly", while Australian right-wing populist Pauline Hanson stated that "I care so passionately about this country, it's like I'm its mother. Australia is my home and the Australian people are my children."

Populist leaders typically portray themselves as outsiders who are separate from the "elite". Female populist leaders sometimes reference their gender as setting them apart from the dominant "old boys' club", while in Latin America a number of populists, such as Evo Morales and Alberto Fujimori, emphasised their non-white ethnic background to set them apart from the white-dominated elite. Other populists have used clothing to set them apart. In South Africa, the populist Julius Malema and members of his Economic Freedom Fighters attended parliament dressed as miners and workers to distinguish themselves from the other politicians wearing suits. In instances where wealthy business figures promote populist sentiments, such as Ross Perot, Thaksin Shinawatra, or Berlusconi, it can be difficult to present themselves as being outside the elite, however this is achieved by portraying themselves as being apart from the political, if not the economic elite, and portraying themselves as reluctant politicians.
Mudde and Rovira Kaltwasser noted that "in reality, most populist leaders are very much part of the national elite", typically being highly educated, upper-middle class, middle-aged males from the majority ethnicity.

Mudde and Rovira Kaltwasser suggested that "true outsiders" to the political system are rare, although cited instances like Venezuela's Chávez and Peru's Fujimori. More common is that they are "insider-outsiders", strongly connected to the inner circles of government but not having ever been part of it. The Dutch right-wing populist Geert Wilders had for example been a prominent back-bench MP for many years before launching his populist Party for Freedom, while in South Africa, Malema had been leader of the governing African National Congress (ANC) youth league until he was expelled, at which he launched his own populist movement. Only a few populist leaders are "insiders", individuals who have held leading roles in government prior to portraying themselves as populists. One example is Thaksin Shinawatra, who was twice deputy prime minister of Thailand before launching his own populist political party; another is Rafael Correa, who served as the Ecuadorean finance minister before launching a left-wing populist challenge.

Populist leaders are sometimes also characterised as strongmen or—in Latin American countries—as caudillos. In a number of cases, such as Argentina's Perón or Venezuela's Chávez, these leaders have military backgrounds which contribute to their strongman image.
Other populist leaders have also evoked the strongman image without having a military background; these include Italy's Berlusconi, Slovakia's Mečiar, and Thailand's Thaksin Shinawatra.
Populism and strongmen are not intrinsically connected, however; as stressed by Mudde and Rovira Kaltwasser, "only a minority of strongmen are populists and only a minority of populists is a strongman". Rather than being populists, many strongmen—such as Spain's Francisco Franco—were elitists who led authoritarian administrations.

In most cases, these populist leaders built a political organisation around themselves, typically a political party, although in many instances these remain dominated by the leader. These individuals often give a populist movement its political identity, as is seen with movements like Fortuynism in the Netherlands, Peronism in Argentina, Berlusconism in Italy and Chavismo in Venezuela. Populist mobilisation is not however always linked to a charismatic leadership. Mudde and Rovira Kaltwasser suggested that populist personalist leadership was more common in countries with a presidential system rather than a parliamentary one because these allow for the election of a single individual to the role of head of government without the need for an accompanying party. Examples where a populist leader has been elected to the presidency without an accompanying political party have included Peron in Argentina, Fujimori in Peru, and Correa in Ecuador.

Media 

A subset of populism which deals with the use of media by politicians is called "media populism".

Populist leaders often use the media in order to mobilize their support. In Latin America, there is a long tradition of using mass media as a way for charismatic leaders to directly communicate with the poorly educated masses, first by radio and then by television. The former Venezuelan President Hugo Chavez had a weekly show called Aló Presidente, which according to historian Enrique Krauze gave some Venezuelans "at least the appearance of contact with power, through his verbal and visual presence, which may be welcomed by people who have spent most of their lives being ignored."

The media has also been argued to have helped populists in countries of other regions by giving exposure to the most controversial politicians for commercial reasons. Donald Trump was claimed to have received $5 billion worth of free coverage during his 2016 campaign. Tabloids are often stereotyped as presenting a platform for populist politics due to their tendency toward melodrama, infotainment, and conflict, and thus provide support for populist parties. Examples of this have been the support given by Kronen Zeitung to the Austrian Freedom Party and the Berlusconi-owned presses' support for Italy's National Alliance in the mid-1990s. Based on his analysis of Dutch and British media, Tjitske Akkerman however argued that tabloids were no more prone to populism than the quality press.

In the 21st century, populists have increasingly used social media to bypass the mainstream media and directly approach their target audiences. In earlier periods, before radio, thought "mass media" newspapers tended to operate more like social media than modern newspapers, publishing local gossip and with little fact-checking; the expansion of newspapers to rural areas of the United States in the early tweenith century increased support for populist partied and positions. It has been claimed that while traditional media, acting as so-called ‘gatekeepers’, filter the messages that they broadcast through journalistic norms, social media permits a ‘direct linkage’ from political actors to potential audiences. It has been claimed that the use of Twitter helped Donald Trump win the US presidency, while the same has been claimed regarding the use of YouTube by the Jair Bolsonaro 2018 presidential campaign.

Presidential systems 
Populist leaders have been claimed to be more successful in presidential systems. This is because such systems give advantage to charismatic populist leaders, especially when institutionalized parties are weak. This is especially the case in two-round systems, because outsiders who might not win most votes in the first round of voting might be able to do so when faced against a mainstream candidate in the second round. This has been claimed to be evident in the 1990 Peruvian general election won by Alberto Fujimori, who lost on the first round. Furthermore, Juan José Linz has argued that the direct relationship between the president and the electorate fosters a populist perception of the president as representing the whole people and their opponents as resisting the popular will.

Political parties

Another form of mobilisation is through populist political parties.
Populists are not generally opposed to political representation, but merely want their own representatives, those of "the people", in power. In various cases, non-populist political parties have transitioned into populist ones; the elitist Socialist Unity Party of Germany, a Marxist–Leninist group which governed East Germany, later transitioned after German re-unification into a populist party, The Left. In other instances, such as the Austrian FPÖ and Swiss SVP, a non-populist party can have a populist faction which later takes control of the whole party.

In some examples where a political party has been dominated by a single charismatic leader, the latter's death has served to unite and strengthen the party, as with Argentina's Justicialist Party after Juan Perón's death in 1974, or the United Socialist Party of Venezuela after Chávez's death in 2013. In other cases, a populist party has seen one strong centralising leader replace another, as when Marine Le Pen replaced her father Jean-Marie as the leader of the National Front in 2011, or when Heinz-Christian Strache took over from Haider as chair of the Freedom Party of Austria in 2005.

Many populist parties achieve an electoral breakthrough but then fail to gain electoral persistence, with their success fading away at subsequent elections. In various cases, they are able to secure regional strongholds of support but with little support elsewhere in the country; the Alliance for the Future of Austria (BZÖ) for instance gained national representation in the Austrian parliament solely because of its strong support in Carinthia. Similarly, the Belgian Vlaams Belang party has its stronghold in Antwerp, while the Swiss People's Party has its stronghold in Zurich.

Social movements

An additional form is that of the populist social movement. Populist social movements are comparatively rare, as most social movements focus on a more restricted social identity or issue rather than identifying with "the people" more broadly. However, after the Great Recession of 2007 a number of populist social movements emerged, expressing public frustrations with national and international economic systems. These included the Occupy movement, which originated in the US and used the slogan "We are the 99%", and the Spanish Indignados movement, which employed the motto: "real democracy now—we are not goods in the hands of politicians and bankers".

Few populist social movements survive for more than a few years, with most examples, like the Occupy movement, petering out after their initial growth. In some cases, the social movement fades away as a strong leader emerges from within it and moves into electoral politics. An example of this can be seen with the India Against Corruption social movement, from which emerged Arvind Kejriwal, who founded the Aam Aadmi Party ("Common Man Party"). Another is the Spanish Indignados movement which appeared in 2011 before spawning the Podemos party led by Pablo Iglesias Turrión. These populist social movements can exert a broader societal impact which results in populist politicians emerging to prominence; the Tea Party and Occupy movements that appeared in the US during the late 2000s and early 2010s have been seen as an influence on the rise of Donald Trump and Bernie Sanders as prominent figures in the mid-2010s.

Some populist leaders have sought to broaden their support by creating supporter groups within the country. Chavez, for instance, ordered the formation of Bolivarian Circles, Communal Councils, Urban Land Committees, and Technical Water Roundtables across Venezuela. These could improve political participation among poorer sectors of Venezuelan society, although also served as networks through which the state transferred resources to those neighbourhoods which produced high rates of support for Chavez government.

Other themes

Democracy

Populism is a flexible term as it can be seen to exist in both democracies as well as authoritarian regimes. There have been intense debates about the relationship between populism and democracy. Some regard populism as being an intrinsic danger to democracy; others regard it as the only "true" form of democracy. Populists often present themselves as "true democrats". It could be argued that populism is democratic as it allows voters to remove governments they don’t approve via the ballot box because voting is an essential value for a state to be considered a democracy. Albertazzi and McDonnell stated that populism and democracy were "inextricably linked", the political scientist Manuel Anselmi described populism as being "deeply connected with democracy", and March suggested that populism represented a "critique of democracy, not an alternative to it". Mudde and Rovira Kaltwasser write that "In a world that is dominated by democracy and liberalism, populism has essentially become an illiberal democratic response to undemocratic liberalism." Adamidis argues that the effect of populism on democracy can be measured by reference to its impact on the democratic legal systems and, in particular, to the changes it effects on their rule of recognition.

Populism can serve as a democratic corrective by contributing to the mobilisation of social groups who feel excluded from political decision making. It can also raise awareness among the socio-political elites of popular concerns in society, even if it makes the former uncomfortable. When some populists have taken power—most notably, Chávez in Venezuela—they have enhanced the use of direct democracy through the regular application of referendums. For this reason, some democratic politicians have argued that they need to become more populist: René Cuperus of the Dutch Labour Party for instance called for social democracy to become "more 'populist' in a leftist way" in order to engage with voters who felt left behind by cultural and technological change.

Mudde and Rovira Kaltwasser argued that "populism is essentially democratic, but at odds with  democracy," since populism is based on putting into effect "the will of the people". It is therefore majoritarian in nature, and opposed to the safeguarding of minority rights, which is a defining feature of liberal democracy. Populism also undermines the tenets of liberal democracy by rejecting notions of pluralism and the idea that anything, including constitutional limits, should constrain the "general will" of "the people". In this, populist governance can lead to what the liberal philosopher John Stuart Mill described as the "tyranny of the majority".

Populists tend to view democratic institutions as alienating, and in practice, populists operating in liberal democracies have often criticised the independent institutions designed to protect the fundamental rights of minorities, particularly the judiciary and the media. Berlusconi for instance criticised the Italian judiciary for defending the rights of communists. In countries like Hungary, Ecuador, and Venezuela, populist governments have curtailed the independent media. Minorities have often suffered as a result; in Europe in particular, ethnic minorities have had their rights undermined by populism, while in Latin America it is political opposition groups who have been undermined by populist governments. In several instances—such as Orban in Hungary—the populist leader has set the country on a path of de-democratisation by changing the constitution to centralise increasing levels of power in the head of government. A December 2018 study of 46 populist leaders argued that populists, regardless of their position on the political spectrum, were more likely to damage democratic institutions, erode checks and balances on the executive branch, cause democratic backsliding and attack individual rights than non-populists.

Even when not elected into office, populist parties can have an impact in shaping the national political agenda; in Western Europe, parties like the French National Front and Danish People's Party did not generally get more than 10 or 20% of the national vote, but mainstream parties shifted their own policies to meet the populist challenge.

Mainstream responses
Mudde and Rovira Kaltwasser suggested that to deflate the appeal of populism, those government figures found guilty of corruption need to be seen to face adequate punishment. They also argued that stronger rule of law and the elimination of systemic corruption were also important facets in preventing populist growth. They believed that mainstream politicians wishing to reduce the populist challenge should be more open about the restrictions of their power, noting that those who backed populist movements were often frustrated with the dishonesty of established politicians who "claim full agency when things go well and almost full lack of agency when things go wrong". They also suggested that the appeal of populism could be reduced by wider civic education in the values of liberal democracy and the relevance of pluralism. What Mudde and Rovira Kaltwasser believed was ineffective was a full-frontal attack on the populists which presented "them" as "evil" or "foolish", for this strategy plays into the binary division that populists themselves employ. In their view, "the best way to deal with populism is to engage—as difficult as it is—in an open dialogue with populist actors and supporters" in order to "better understand the claims and grievances of the populist elites and masses and to develop liberal democratic responses to them".

Mainstream politicians have sometimes sought to co-operate or build alliances with populists. In the United States, for example, various Republican Party figures aligned themselves with the Tea Party movement, while in countries such as Finland and Austria populist parties have taken part in governing coalitions. In other instances, mainstream politicians have adopted elements of a populist political style while competing against populist opponents. Various mainstream centrist figures, such as Hillary Clinton and Tony Blair, have argued that governments needed to restrict migration to hinder the appeal of right-wing populists utilising anti-immigrant sentiment in elections.

A more common approach has been for mainstream parties to openly attack the populists and construct a cordon sanitaire to prevent them from gaining political office  Once populists are in political office in liberal democracies, the judiciary can play a key role in blocking some of their more illiberal policies, as has been the case in Slovakia and Poland. The mainstream media can play an important role in blocking populist growth; in a country like Germany, the mainstream media is for instant resolutely anti-populist, opposing populist groups whether left or right.
Mudde and Rovira Kaltwasser noted that there was an "odd love-hate relationship between populist media and politicians, sharing a discourse but not a struggle". In certain countries, certain mainstream media outlets have supported populist groups; in Austria, the Kronen Zeitung played a prominent role in endorsing Haider, in the United Kingdom the Daily Express supported the UK Independence Party, while in the United States, Fox News gave much positive coverage and encouragement to the Tea Party movement. In some cases, when the populists have taken power, their political rivals have sought to violently overthrow them; this was seen in the 2002 Venezuelan coup d'état attempt, when mainstream groups worked with sectors of the military to unseat Hugo Chávez's government.

Another discursive strategy of mainstream parties dealing with populist actors is demonization. However, Schwörer and Fernández-García found that this practice is less common in Western Europe as usually assumed and that the center-right even refuses to harshly attack the populist radical right. In a similar vein, mainstream parties use the term "populism" to delegitimize populist actors due to its negative connotation among the public but also use the term to attack non-populist competitors.

Authoritarianism
Scholars have argued that populist elements have sometimes appeared in authoritarian movements. The scholar Luke March argued that the populist Narodnik movement of late 19th-century Russia influenced the radical rejection on the constitutional limits of the state found in Marxism–Leninism. Although the Marxist–Leninist movement often used populist rhetoric—in the 1960s, the Communist Party of the Soviet Union called itself the "party of the Soviet people"—in practice its emphasis on an elite vanguard is anti-populist in basis. Some, but not all, populists are authoritarian, emphasizing "the importance of protecting traditional lifestyles against perceived threats from 'outsiders', even at the expense of civil liberties and minority rights."

The historian Roger Eatwell noted that although fascism and populism "differ notably ideologically", fascist politicians have "borrowed aspects of populist discourse and style". Some fascists have for instance used the terms "people" and "nation" synonymously. However, fascism generally distinguishes itself from populism by not recognising the democratic rights of the people or believing that they are capable of governing, instead maintaining that a vanguard should take charge. According to Eatwell, "major ideological differences ... lie at the core" of fascism and populism, the former being anti-democratic and latter being rooted in democracy, "albeit not liberal democracy". The historian Peter Fritzsche nevertheless argued that populist movements active in Weimar Germany helped to facilitate the environment in which the fascist Nazi Party could rise to power. Fritzsche also noted that the Nazis utilised, "at least rhetorically", the "populist ideal of the people's community.

At the turn of the 21st century, the pink tide spreading over Latin America was "prone to populism and authoritarianism". Chavez's Venezuela and Correa's Ecuador have both been characterised as having moved toward authoritarianism. Steven Levitsky and James Loxton, as well as Raúl Madrid, stated that Venezuelan president Hugo Chávez and his regional allies used populism to achieve their dominance and later established authoritarian regimes when they were empowered. Such actions, Weyland argues, proves that "Populism, understood as a strategy for winning and exerting state power, inherently stands in tension with democracy and the value that it places upon pluralism, open debate, and fair competition".

A 2018 analysis by political scientists Yascha Mounk and Jordan Kyle links populism to democratic backsliding, showing that since 1990, "13 right-wing populist governments have been elected; of these, five brought about significant democratic backsliding. Over the same time period, 15 left-wing populist governments were elected; of these, the same number, five, brought about significant democratic backsliding."

History

Mudde and Rovira Kaltwasser argue that populism is a modern phenomenon. However, attempts have been made to identify manifestations of populism in the democracy of classical Athens. Eatwell noted that although the actual term populism parallels that of the Populares who were active in the Roman Republic, these and other pre-modern groups "did not develop a truly populist ideology." The origins of populism are often traced to the late nineteenth century, when movements calling themselves populist arose in both the United States and the Russian Empire. Populism has often been linked to the spread of democracy, both as an idea and as a framework for governance.

Conversely, the historian Barry S. Strauss argued that populism could also be seen in the ancient world, citing the examples of the fifth-century B.C. Athens and Populares, a political faction active in the Roman Republic from the second century BCE. The historian Rachel Foxley argued that the Levellers of 17th-century England could also be labelled "populists", meaning that they believed "equal natural rights ... must shape political life" while the historian Peter Blickle linked populism to the Protestant Reformation.

Europe

19th and 20th centuries

In the Russian Empire during the late 19th century, the narodnichestvo movement emerged, championing the cause of the empire's peasantry against the governing elites. The movement was unable to secure its objectives; however, it inspired other agrarian movements across eastern Europe in the early 20th century. Although the Russian movement was primarily a movement of the middle class and intellectuals "going to the people", in some respects their agrarian populism was similar to that of the US People's Party, with both presenting small farmers (the peasantry in Europe) as the foundation of society and main source of societal morality. According to Eatwell, the narodniks "are often seen as the first populist movement".

In German-speaking Europe, the völkisch movement has often been characterised as populist, with its exultation of the German people and its anti-elitist attacks on capitalism and Jews. In France, the Boulangist movement also utilised populist rhetoric and themes. In the early 20th century, adherents of both Marxism and fascism flirted with populism, but both movements remained ultimately elitist, emphasising the idea of a small elite who should guide and govern society. Among Marxists, the emphasis on class struggle and the idea that the working classes are affected by false consciousness are also antithetical to populist ideas.

In the years following the Second World War, populism was largely absent from Europe, in part due to the domination of elitist Marxism–Leninism in Eastern Europe and a desire to emphasise moderation among many West European political parties. However, over the coming decades, a number of right-wing populist parties emerged throughout the continent. These were largely isolated and mostly reflected a conservative agricultural backlash against the centralisation and politicisation of the agricultural sector then occurring. These included Guglielmo Giannini's Common Man's Front in 1940s Italy, Pierre Poujade's Union for the Defense of Tradesmen and Artisans in late 1950s France, Hendrik Koekoek's Farmers' Party of the 1960s Netherlands, and Mogens Glistrup's Progress Party of 1970s Denmark. Between the late 1960s and the early 1980s there also came a concerted populist critique of society from Europe's New Left, including from the new social movements and from the early Green parties. However it was only in the late 1990s, according to Mudde and Rovira Kaltwasser, that populism became "a relevant political force in Europe", one which could have a significant impact on mainstream politics.

Following the fall of the Soviet Union and the Eastern Bloc of the early 1990s, there was a rise in populism across much of Central and Eastern Europe. In the first multiparty elections in many of these countries, various parties portrayed themselves as representatives of "the people" against the "elite", representing the old governing Marxist–Leninist parties. The Czech Civic Forum party for instance campaigned on the slogan "Parties are for party members, Civic Forum is for everybody". Many populists in this region claimed that a "real" revolution had not occurred during the transition from Marxist–Leninist to liberal democratic governance in the early 1990s and that it was they who were campaigning for such a change. The collapse of Marxism–Leninism as a central force in socialist politics also led to a broader growth of left-wing populism across Europe, reflected in groups like the Dutch Socialist Party, Scottish Socialist Party, and German's The Left party. Since the late 1980s, populist experiences emerged in Spain around the figures of José María Ruiz Mateos, Jesús Gil and Mario Conde, businessmen who entered politics chiefly to defend their personal economic interests, but by the turn of the millennium their proposals had proved to meet a limited support at the ballots at the national level.

21st century

At the turn of the 21st century, populist rhetoric and movements became increasingly apparent in Western Europe. Populist rhetoric was often used by opposition parties. For example, in the 2001 electoral campaign, the Conservative Party leader William Hague accused Tony Blair's governing Labour Party government of representing "the condescending liberal elite". Hague repeatedly referring to it as "metropolitan", implying that it was out of touch with "the people", who in Conservative discourse are represented by "Middle England". Blair's government also employed populist rhetoric; in outlining legislation to curtail fox hunting on animal welfare grounds, it presented itself as championing the desires of the majority against the upper-classes who engaged in the sport. Blair's rhetoric has been characterised as the adoption of a populist style rather than the expression of an underlying populist ideology.

By the 21st century, European populism was again associated largely with the political right. The term came to be used in reference both to radical right groups like Jörg Haider's FPÖ in Austria and Jean-Marie Le Pen's FN in France, as well as to non-radical right-wing groups like Silvio Berlusconi's Forza Italia or Pim Fortuyn's LPF in the Netherlands. The populist radical right combined populism with authoritarianism and nativism. Conversely, the Great Recession also resulted in the emergence of left-wing populist groups in parts of Europe, most notably the Syriza party which gained political office in Greece and the Podemos party in Spain, displaying similarities with the US-based Occupy movement. Like Europe's right-wing populists, these groups also expressed Eurosceptic sentiment towards the European Union, albeit largely from a socialist and anti-austerity perspective rather than the nationalist perspective adopted by their right-wing counterparts. Populists have entered government in many countries across Europe, both in coalitions with other parties as well by themselves, Austria and Poland are examples of these respectively.

The UK Labour Party under the leadership of Jeremy Corbyn has been called populist, with the slogan "for the many not the few" having been used. Corbyn was suspended from Labour following findings on unlawful action from an Equality and Human Rights Commission report. Corbyn's suspension was controversial, and many local Labour Parties passed motions opposing the decision.

The United Kingdom Independence Party (UKIP) had been characterised as a right-wing populist party.  After the 2016 UK referendum on membership of the European Union, in which British citizens voted to leave, some have claimed the "Brexit" as a victory for populism, encouraging a flurry of calls for referendums among other EU countries by populist political parties.

North America 

In North America, populism has often been characterised by regional mobilisation and loose organisation. During the late 19th and early 20th centuries, populist sentiments became widespread, particularly in the western provinces of Canada, and in the southwest and Great Plains regions of the United States. In this instance, populism was combined with agrarianism and often known as "prairie populism". For these groups, "the people" were yeomen—small, independent farmers —while the "elite" were the bankers and politicians of the northeast. In some cases, populist activists called for alliances with labor (the first national platform of the National People's Party in 1892 calling for protecting the rights of "urban workmen". In the state of Georgia in the early 1890s, Thomas E. Watson (later the Populist candidate for Vice-President) led a major effort to unite white and African-American farmers.

The People's Party of the late 19th century United States is considered to be "one of the defining populist movements"; its members were often referred to as the Populists at the time. Its radical platform included calling for the nationalisation of railways, the banning of strikebreakers, and the introduction of referendums. The party gained representation in several state legislatures during the 1890s, but was not powerful enough to mount a successful presidential challenge. In the 1896 presidential election, the People's Party supported the Democratic Party candidate William Jennings Bryan; after his defeat, the People's Party's support declined. Other early populist political parties in the United States included the Greenback Party, the Progressive Party of 1912 led by Theodore Roosevelt, the Progressive Party of 1924 led by Robert M. La Follette, Sr., and the Share Our Wealth movement of Huey P Long in 1933–1935. In Canada, populist groups adhering to a social credit ideology had various successes at local and regional elections from the 1930s to the 1960s, although the main Social Credit Party of Canada never became a dominant national force.

By the mid-20th century, US populism had moved from a largely progressive to a largely reactionary stance, being closely intertwined with the anti-communist politics of the period. In this period, the historian Richard Hofstadter and sociologist Daniel Bell compared the anti-elitism of the 1890s Populists with that of Joseph McCarthy. Although not all academics accepted the comparison between the left-wing, anti-big business Populists and the right-wing, anti-communist McCarthyites, the term "populist" nonetheless came to be applied to both left-wing and right-wing groups that blamed elites for the problems facing the country. Some mainstream politicians in the Republican Party recognised the utility of such a tactic and adopted it; Republican President Richard Nixon for instance popularised the term "silent majority" when appealing to voters. Right-wing populist rhetoric was also at the base of two of the most successful third-party presidential campaigns in the late 20th century, that of George C. Wallace in 1968 and Ross Perot in 1992. These politicians presented a consistent message that a "liberal elite" was threatening "our way of life" and using the welfare state to placate the poor and thus maintain their own power.

Former Oklahoma Senator Fred R. Harris, first elected in 1964, ran unsuccessfully for the US presidency in 1972 and 1976. Harris' New Populism embraced egalitarian themes.

In the first decade of the 21st century, two populist movements appeared in the US, both in response to the Great Recession: the Occupy movement and the Tea Party movement. The populist approach of the Occupy movement was broader, with its "people" being what it called "the 99%", while the "elite" it challenged was presented as both the economic and political elites. The Tea Party's populism was Producerism, while "the elite" it presented was more party partisan than that of Occupy, being defined largely—although not exclusively—as the Democratic administration of President Barack Obama.
The 2016 presidential election saw a wave of populist sentiment in the campaigns of Bernie Sanders and Donald Trump, with both candidates running on anti-establishment platforms in the Democratic and Republican parties, respectively. Both campaigns criticised free trade deals such as the North American Free Trade Agreement and the Trans-Pacific Partnership. Other studies have noted an emergence of populist rhetoric and a decline in the value of prior experience in U.S. intra-party contests such as congressional primaries.

Latin America 

Populism has been dominant in Latin American politics since the 1930s and 1940s, being far more prevalent there than in Europe. Mudde and Rovira Kaltwasser noted that the region has the world's "most enduring and prevalent populist tradition". They suggested that this was the case because it was a region with a long tradition of democratic governance and free elections, but with high rates of socio-economic inequality, generating widespread resentments that politicians can articulate through populism. March instead thought that it was the important role of "catch-all parties and prominent personalities" in Latin American politics which had made populism more common.

The first wave of Latin American populism began at the start of the Great Depression in 1929 and last until the end of the 1960s. In various countries, politicians took power while emphasising "the people": these included Getúlio Vargas in Brazil, Juan Perón in Argentina, and José María Velasco Ibarra in Ecuador. These relied on the Americanismo ideology, presenting a common identity across Latin America and denouncing any interference from imperialist powers. The second wave took place in the early 1990s; de la Torre called it "neoliberal populism". In the late 1980s, many Latin American states were experiencing economic crisis and several populist figures were elected by blaming the elites for this situation. Examples include Carlos Menem in Argentina, Fernando Collor de Mello in Brazil, and Alberto Fujimori in Peru. Once in power, these individuals pursued neoliberal economic strategies recommended by the International Monetary Fund (IMF). Unlike the first wave, the second did not include an emphasis on Americanismo or anti-imperialism.

The third wave began in the final years of the 1990s and continued into the 21st century. It overlapped in part with the pink tide of left-wing resurgence in Latin America. Like the first wave, the third made heavy use of Americanismo and anti-imperialism, although this time these themes presented alongside an explicitly socialist programme that opposed the free market. Prominent examples included Hugo Chávez in Venezuela, Cristina de Kirchner in Argentina, Evo Morales in Bolivia, Rafael Correa in Ecuador, and Daniel Ortega in Nicaragua. These socialist populist governments have presented themselves as giving sovereignty "back to the people", in particular through the formation of constituent assemblies that would draw up new constitutions, which could then be ratified via referendums. In this way they claimed to be correcting the problems of social and economic injustice that liberal democracy had failed to deal with, replacing it with superior forms of democracy.

Oceania 

During the 1990s, there was a growth in populism in both Australia and New Zealand.

In New Zealand, Robert Muldoon, the 31st Prime Minister of New Zealand from 1975 to 1984, had been cited as a populist. Populism has become a pervasive trend in New Zealand politics since the introduction of the mixed-member proportional voting system in 1996. The New Zealand Labour Party's populist appeals in its 1999 election campaign and advertising helped to propel the party to victory in that election. New Zealand First has presented a more lasting populist platform; long-time party leader Winston Peters has been characterised by some as a populist who uses anti-establishment rhetoric, though in a uniquely New Zealand style.

Sub-Saharan Africa

In much of Africa, populism has been a rare phenomenon. The political scientist Danielle Resnick argued that populism first became apparent in Africa during the 1980s, when a series of coups brought military leaders to power in various countries. In Ghana, for example, Jerry Rawlings took control, professing that he would involve "the people" in "the decision-making process", something he claimed had previously been denied to them. A similar process took place in neighbouring Burkina Faso under the military leader Thomas Sankara, who professed to "take power out of the hands of our national
bourgeoisie and their imperialist allies and put it in the hands of the people". Such military leaders claimed to represent "the voice of the people", utilised an anti-establishment discourse, and established participatory organisations through which to maintain links with the broader population.

In the 21st century, with the establishment of multi-party democratic systems in much of Sub-Saharan Africa, new populist politicians have appeared. These have included Kenya's Raila Odinga, Senegal's Abdoulaye Wade, South Africa's Julius Malema, and Zambia's Michael Sata. These populists have arisen in democratic rather than authoritarian states, and have arisen amid dissatisfaction with democratisation, socio-economic grievances, and frustration at the inability of opposition groups to oust incumbent parties.

Asia and the Arab world

In North Africa, populism was associated with the approaches of several political leaders active in the 20th century, most notably Egypt's Gamal Abdel Nasser and Libya's Muammar Gaddafi. However, populist approaches only became more popular in the Middle East during the early 21st century, by which point it became integral to much of the region's politics. Here, it became an increasingly common element of mainstream politics in established representative democracies, associated with longstanding leaders like Israel's Benjamin Netanyahu. Although the Arab Spring was not a populist movement itself, populist rhetoric was present among protesters.

In southeast Asia, populist politicians emerged in the wake of the 1997 Asian financial crisis. In the region, various populist governments took power but were removed soon after: these include the administrations of Joseph Estrada in the Philippines, Roh Moo-hyun in South Korea, Chen Shui-bian in Taiwan, and Thaksin Shinawatra in Thailand.
In India, the Hindu nationalist Bharatiya Janata Party (BJP) which rose to increasing power in the early 21st century adopted a right-wing populist position. Unlike many other successful populist groups, the BJP was not wholly reliant on the personality of its leader, but survived as a powerful electoral vehicle under several leaders.

Late 20th- and early 21st-century growth
Sheri Berman reviews various explanations of populism including "demand- and supply-side explanations of populism, economic grievance–based and sociocultural grievance–based explanations of populism, and structure- and agency-based explanations of populism".  There is now a wide-ranging and interdisciplinary literature in this area.

In the early 1990s, there was an increasing awareness of populism in established liberal democracies, sometimes referred to as the "New Populism". The UK's referendum on European Union membership and the election of Donald Trump, both in 2016, generated a substantial rise in interest in the concept from both academics and the public. By 2016, "populism" was regularly used by political commentators.

A 2017 review of votes for populistic parties in all developed countries discovered them spiking in 2015 and reaching highest levels since WWII.

Mudde argued that by the early 1990s, populism had become a regular feature in Western democracies. He attributed this to changing perceptions of government that had spread in this period, which in turn he traced to the changing role of the media to focus increasingly on sensationalism and scandals. Since the late 1960s, the emergence of television had allowed for the increasing proliferation of the Western media, with media outlets becoming increasingly independent of political parties. As private media companies have had to compete against each other, they have placed an increasing focus on scandals and other sensationalist elements of politics, in doing so promoting anti-governmental sentiments among their readership and cultivating an environment prime for populists. At the same time, politicians increasingly faced television interviews, exposing their flaws. News media had also taken to interviewing fewer accredited experts, and instead favouring interviewing individuals found on the street as to their views about current events. At the same time, mass media was giving less attention to the "high culture" of elites and more to other sectors of society, as reflected in reality television shows such as Big Brother.

Mudde argued that another reason for the growth of Western populism in this period was the improved education of the populace; since the 1960s, citizens have expected more from their politicians and felt increasingly competent to judge their actions. This in turn has led to an increasingly sceptical attitude toward mainstream politicians and governing groups. In Mudde's words, "More and more citizens think they have a good understanding of what politicians do, and think they can do it better."

Another factor is that in the post-Cold War period, liberal democracies no longer had the one-party states of the Eastern Bloc against which to favourably compare themselves; citizens were therefore increasingly able to compare the realities of the liberal democratic system with theoretical models of democracy, and find the former wanting. There is also the impact of globalisation, which is seen as having seriously limited the powers of national elites. Such factors undermine citizens' belief in the competency of governing elite, opening up space for charismatic leadership to become increasingly popular; although charismatic leadership is not the same as populist leadership, populists have been the main winners of this shift towards charismatic leadership.
Peter Wilkins has argued that "The end of history and the post-Cold War extension and deepening of capitalism are central to understanding the rise of contemporary populist movements." 

Pippa Norris and  Ronald Inglehart connect economic and sociocultural theories of the causes of support for the growing populist movements in Western societies. The first theory they examine is the economic insecurity perspective which focuses on the consequences created by a transforming contemporary workforce and society in post-industrial economies. Norris suggests that events such as globalisation, China's membership of the World Trade Organisation and cheaper imports have left the unsecured members of society (low-waged unskilled workers, single parents, the long term unemployed and the poorer white populations) seeking populist leaders such as Donald Trump and Nigel Farage.  The other theory is the cultural backlash thesis, in which Norris and Inglehart suggest that the rise of populism is a reaction from previously dominant sectors of the population, the white, uneducated, elderly men of today, who feel threatened and marginalised by the progressive values of modern society. These groups in particular have a growing resentment towards their traditional values being scolded as politically incorrect and are much more likely to become supportive of anti-establishment, xenophobic political parties.
Norris and Inglehart have analyzed data from the World Values Survey.  On this basis, they argue that while the proximate cause of right-wing populist voting may be identified in sociocultural grievances, such grievances are increasingly being driven by economic insecurity and the erosion of traditional values.

See also 

 Anti-elitism
 Argumentum ad populum
 Black populism
 Class warfare
 Communitarianism
 List of populists
 Ochlocracy (mob rule)
 Paternalism
 Penal populism
 Politainment
 Political polarization
 Poporanism
 Populism in Latin America
 Third party (politics)
 Tyranny of the majority

References

Notes

Bibliography

 
 Adamidis, Vasileios (2021), Democracy, Populism, and the rule of law: A reconsideration of their interconnectedness Politics SAGE.
 Adamidis, Vasileios (2021), Populism and the rule of recognition: challenging the foundations of democratic legal systems. Populism 4(1): 1-24.
 Adamidis, Vasileios (2019), Manifestations of populism in late 5th century Athens. In: D.A. FRENKEL and N. VARGA, eds., New studies in law and history. Athens: Athens Institute for Education and Research, pp. 11–28. ISBN 9789605982386
 
 
 
 
 
 
 
 
  .
 
 
 
 
 
 
 
 
 
 
 
 
 
 
 1

Further reading

 Abromeit, John et al., eds. Transformations of Populism in Europe and the Americas: History and Recent Tendencies (Bloomsbury, 2015). xxxii, 354 pp.
 Adamidis, Vasileios (2021), Populism and the rule of recognition: challenging the foundations of democratic legal systems. Populism 4(1): 1-24.
 Adamidis, Vasileios (2021), Populist Rhetorical Strategies in the Courts of classical Athens. Athens Journal of History 7(1): 21-40. 
 Albertazzi, Daniele and Duncan McDonnell. 2008. Twenty-First Century Populism: The Spectre of Western European Democracy Basingstoke and New York: Palgrave Macmillan. 
 Barabanov O., Efremenko D., Kagarlitsky B., Koltashov V., Telin K. Global ‘Rightist Revolt’: Trumpism and Its Foundations . / Valday Discussion Club Report. – Moscow, September 2017.
 Berlet, Chip. 2005. "When Alienation Turns Right: Populist Conspiracism, the Apocalyptic Style, and Neofascist Movements". In Lauren Langman & Devorah Kalekin Fishman, (eds.), Trauma, Promise, and the Millennium: The Evolution of Alienation. Lanham, Maryland: Rowman & Littlefield.
 Boyte, Harry C. 2004. Everyday Politics: Reconnecting Citizens and Public Life. Philadelphia: University of Pennsylvania Press.
 Brass, Tom. 2000. Peasants, Populism and Postmodernism: The Return of the Agrarian Myth. London: Frank Cass Publishers.
 Caiani, Manuela. "Populism/Populist Movements". in The Wiley-Blackwell Encyclopedia of Social and Political Movements (2013).
 Coles, Rom. 2006. "Of Tensions and Tricksters: Grassroots Democracy Between Theory and Practice", Perspectives on Politics Vol. 4:3 (Fall), pp. 547–61
 Denning, Michael. 1997. The Cultural Front: The Laboring of American Culture in the Twentieth Century. London: Verso.
 Emibayer, Mustafa and Ann Mishe. 1998. "What is Agency?", American Journal of Sociology, Vol. 103:4, pp. 962–1023
 Foster, John Bellamy. "This Is Not Populism " (June 2017), Monthly Review
 Goodwyn, Lawrence, 1976, Democratic Promise: The Populist Moment in America. New York: Oxford University Press
 Hogg, Michael A., "Radical Change: Uncertainty in the world threatens our sense of self. To cope, people embrace populism", Scientific American, vol. 321, no. 3 (September 2019), pp. 85–87.
 
 Kazin, Michael. "Trump and American Populism". Foreign Affairs (Nov/Dec 2016), 95#6 pp. 17–24.
 Khoros, Vladimir. 1984. Populism: Its Past, Present and Future. Moscow: Progress Publishers.
 Kling, Joseph M. and Prudence S. Posner. 1990. Dilemmas of Activism. Philadelphia: Temple University Press.
 Kuzminski, Adrian. Fixing the System: A History of Populism, Ancient & Modern. New York: Continuum Books, 2008.
 Laclau, Ernesto. 1977. Politics and Ideology in Marxist Theory: Capitalism, Fascism, Populism. London: NLB/Atlantic Highlands Humanities Press.
 Laclau, Ernesto. 2005. On Populist Reason . London: Verso
 McCoy, Alfred W (2 April 2017). The Bloodstained Rise of Global Populism: A Political Movement’s Violent Pursuit of “Enemies”  , TomDispatch
 Morelock, Jeremiah ed. Critical Theory and Authoritarian Populism . 2018. London: University of Westminster Press.
 Müller, Jan-Werner. What is Populism?  (August 2016), Univ. of Pennsylvania Press. Also by Müller on populism: Capitalism in One Family  (December 2016), London Review of Books, Vol. 38, No. 23, pp. 10–14
 Peters, B. Guy and Jon Pierre. 2020. "A typology of populism: understanding the different forms of populism and their implications." Democratization.
 
 Rupert, Mark. 1997. "Globalization and the Reconstruction of Common Sense in the US". In Innovation and Transformation in International Studies, S. Gill and J. Mittelman, eds. Cambridge: Cambridge University Press.

Europe

 Anselmi, Manuel, 2017. Populism. An Introduction, London: Routledge.
 Betz, Hans-Georg. 1994. Radical Right-wing Populism in Western Europe, New York: St. Martins Press. 
 Fritzsche, Peter. 1990. Rehearsals for Fascism: Populism and Political Mobilization in Weimar Germany. New York: Oxford University Press. 
 De Blasio, Emiliana, Hibberd, Matthew and Sorice, Michele. 2011. Popular politics, populism and the leaders. Access without participation? The cases of Italy and UK. Roma: CMCS-LUISS University. 
 Fritzsche, Peter. 1998. Germans into Nazis. Cambridge, Massachusetts: Harvard University Press.
 Hartleb, Florian 2011: After their establishment: Right-wing Populist Parties in Europe, Centre for European Studies/Konrad-Adenauer-Stiftung, Brüssel,
 
 Wodak, Ruth, Majid KhosraviNik, and Brigitte Mral. "Right-wing populism in Europe". Politics and discourse (2013). online
Kriesi, H. (2014), The Populist Challenge, in West European Politics, vol. 37, n. 2, pp. 361–378.

Latin America

 Conniff, Michael L. "A historiography of populism and neopopulism in Latin America" History Compass (2020) e12621 A historiography of populism and neopopulism in Latin America 
 Conniff, Michael L., ed. Populism in Latin America (1999) essays by experts
 Demmers, Jolle, et al eds. Miraculous Metamorphoses: The Neoliberalization of Latin American Populism (2001)
 Knight, Alan. "Populism and neo-populism in Latin America, especially Mexico." Journal of Latin American Studies 30.2 (1998): 223-248.
 Leaman, David. "Review: Changing Faces of Populism in Latin America: Masks, Makeovers, and Enduring Features" Latin American Research Review 39#3 (2004), pp. 312–326 online

United States
 Abromeit, John. "Frankfurt School Critical Theory and the Persistence of Authoritarian Populism in the United States" In Morelock, Jeremiah Ed. Critical Theory and Authoritarian Populism. 2018. London: University of Westminster Press.
 Agarwal, Sheetal D., et al. "Grassroots organizing in the digital age: considering values and technology in Tea Party and Occupy Wall Street". Information, Communication & Society (2014) 17#3 pp. 326–41.
 Evans, Sara M. and Harry C. Boyte. 1986. Free Spaces: The Sources of Democratic Change in America. New York: Harper & Row.
 Goodwyn, Lawrence. 1976. Democratic Promise: The Populist Moment in America. New York and London: Oxford University Press.; abridged as The Populist Moment: A Short History of the Agrarian Revolt in America. (Oxford University Press, 1978)
 Hahn, Steven. 1983. Roots of Southern Populism: Yeoman Farmers and the Transformation of the Georgia Upcountry, 1850–1890. New York and London: Oxford University Press, 
 Hofstadter, Richard. 1955. The Age of Reform: from Bryan to F.D.R. New York: Knopf.
 Hofstadter, Richard. 1965. The Paranoid Style in American Politics, and Other Essays. New York: Knopf.
 Jeffrey, Julie Roy. 1975. "Women in the Southern Farmers Alliance: A Reconsideration of the Role and Status of Women in the Late 19th Century South". Feminist Studies 3.
 Judis, John B. 2016. The Populist Explosion: How the Great Recession Transformed American and European Politics. New York: Columbia Global Reports. 
 Kazin, Michael. 1995. The Populist Persuasion: An American History. New York: Basic Books. 
 ; 200+ articles in 901 pp
 Maier, Chris. "The Farmers' Fight for Representation: Third-Party Politics in South Dakota, 1889–1918". Great Plains Quarterly (2014) 34#2 pp. 143–62.
 Marable, Manning. 1986. "Black History and the Vision of Democracy", in Harry Boyte and Frank Riessman, Eds., The New Populism: The Politics of Empowerment. Philadelphia: Temple University Press.
 Palmer, Bruce. 1980. Man Over Money: The Southern Populist Critique of American Capitalism. Chapel Hill: University of North Carolina Press.
 Rasmussen, Scott, and Doug Schoen. (2010) Mad as hell: How the Tea Party movement is fundamentally remaking our two-party system (HarperCollins, 2010)
 Stock, Catherine McNicol. 1996. Rural Radicals: Righteous Rage in the American Grain. Ithaca, N.Y.: Cornell University Press. 

 

Comparative politics
 
Political theories
Political ideologies
Political terminology